Ligita Tumāne (born 1 May 1996) is a Latvian footballer who plays as a defender for Italian Serie C club ASD FC Sassari Torres Femminile and the Latvia women's national team.

References

1996 births
Living people
Latvian women's footballers
Women's association football defenders
Rīgas FS players
Torres Calcio Femminile players
Latvia women's youth international footballers
Latvia women's international footballers
Latvian expatriate footballers
Latvian expatriate sportspeople in Italy
Expatriate women's footballers in Italy